Hair casts (also known as "Pseudonits") represent remnants of the inner root sheath, and often occur in great numbers and may mimic nits in the scalp.

See also 
 List of cutaneous conditions

References

 

Conditions of the skin appendages
Hair diseases
Human hair